"Out of Hand" is a song written by Tom Jans and Jeff Barry and recorded by American country music singer Gary Stewart. It was released in October 1974 as the second single and title from the album Out of Hand. The song peaked at number 4 on the U.S. Billboard Hot Country Singles chart and number 10 on the Canadian RPM Country Tracks chart.

Chart performance

References

1974 singles
Gary Stewart (singer) songs
Songs written by Tom Jans
Songs written by Jeff Barry
1974 songs
RCA Records singles